Chance Sumner (born 1977) is an American Paralympic wheelchair rugby player from Colorado Springs, Colorado. In 2005 he won his first gold medal at the 2005 World Wheelchair & Amputee Games and two years later was qualified as USQRA National champion. He is a 2009 American Zonals gold medalist and won it again at both 2008 and 2010 Canada Cups as well. He also won gold at the 2008 Summer Paralympics and bronze at the 2012 Summer Paralympics.

References

1977 births
Living people
Paralympic gold medalists for the United States
Paralympic bronze medalists for the United States
American wheelchair rugby players
Sportspeople from Colorado Springs, Colorado
Wheelchair rugby players at the 2008 Summer Paralympics
Wheelchair rugby players at the 2012 Summer Paralympics
Medalists at the 2008 Summer Paralympics
Medalists at the 2012 Summer Paralympics
Paralympic wheelchair rugby players of the United States
Paralympic medalists in wheelchair rugby